Josué Danny Ortiz Maldonado (July 26, 1976 – February 29, 2004) was a Guatemalan football goalkeeper who played for the Guatemalan national team and CSD Municipal.

Club career
Ortíz played for both Guatemalan giants Comunicaciones and CSD Municipal as well as for CD Suchitepequez and Deportivo Carchá. He succeeded national team goalkeeper Edgar Estrada between the Comunicaciones goalposts when Estrada moved to Municipal, only to take him to Municipal himself a year later in a swap deal which returned Estrada to the Cremas.

International career
Ortiz made his debut for Guatemala in a February 2001 friendly match against Panama and had collected a total of 10 caps, scoring no goals. He had represented his country at the UNCAF Nations Cup 2001 and at the 2002 CONCACAF Gold Cup. He was deemed the natural successor to Edgar Estrada in the national team until his premature death.

His final international was an October 2002 friendly match against Jamaica.

Death
During a 2004 match with Municipal against their eternal rivals and his former club CSD Comunicaciones, the 211th clasico between the clubs, Ortiz collided with Mario Rodríguez of the opposing team, suffering a torn pericardium. He was taken to the Hospital Centro Médico where Ortiz died two hours later.

He became the third Municipal player after Jhonny Aldana and goalkeeper Rolando Marroquín to die while active for the club. His wife and their two children were left behind.

References

External links
 
 Tribute to Dany Ortiz - Seleccion de Guatemala

1976 births
2004 deaths
People from Quetzaltenango Department
Association football goalkeepers
Guatemalan footballers
Guatemala international footballers
C.D. Suchitepéquez players
Comunicaciones F.C. players
C.S.D. Municipal players
2001 UNCAF Nations Cup players
2002 CONCACAF Gold Cup players
Association football players who died while playing
Copa Centroamericana-winning players
Sport deaths in Guatemala